Lyle Stuart Kristiansen (born 9 May 1939 in Vancouver, British Columbia, died 18 June 2015) was a New Democratic Party member of the House of Commons of Canada. He was an executive secretary, financial secretary and woodworker by career.

His first two attempts at a House of Commons seat from British Columbia were unsuccessful. He first campaigned federally in the 1965 federal election at Vancouver Centre electoral district. He would not run again until the 1979 federal election at Kootenay West.

He was successful in his third federal attempt in 1980 election at Kootenay West. He lost this seat in the 1984 general election, but returned to Ottawa after the 1988 federal election at the Kootenay West--Revelstoke riding. Kristiansen did not contest another federal election and left federal politics in 1993. He served in the 32nd and 34th Canadian Parliaments.

In his later years, Lyle became the BCFORUM Representative on the Sunshine Coast Labour Council, where he was considered both an asset, and a friend by all who served on the council with him.

Electoral record

References
 

1939 births
Canadian people of Danish descent
Living people
Members of the House of Commons of Canada from British Columbia
New Democratic Party MPs
Politicians from Vancouver